Patrick de Radiguès was born in Leuven, Belgium on 25 July 1956 and now based in Monaco. He started his racing cars and motorcyles competing at Le Mans. He started sailing world at the 36 years old and liked the adventure of short handed offshore. He was lucky to survive the 2000 Vendee Globe accident in which he was knocked unconscious and the boat washed up ashore.

Race results
Winner of the 1984 Bol d'Or,
2nd in the 1984 Motorcycle Endurance Championship
3rd of the Transat Jacques Vabre on the Novia with Yves Le Cornec
5th of the Transat Québec-Saint-Malo on the Novia(1995)
Not ranked at the 1996–1997 Vendée Globe on AFIBEL
Abandoned at the 2000–2001 Vendée Globe on the IMOCA 50 Libre Belgique
Coskipper by Jean-Luc Nélias on the Trimaran Belgacom (2001)

References

1965 births
Living people
Belgian male sailors (sport)
Sportspeople from Leuven
IMOCA 50 class sailors
IMOCA 60 class sailors
Belgian Vendee Globe sailors
1996 Vendee Globe sailors
2000 Vendee Globe sailors
Belgian motorcycle racers
Belgian racing drivers
24 Hours of Le Mans drivers